NGC 550 is a spiral galaxy in the constellation Cetus. It is estimated to be about 300 million light-years from the Milky Way and has a diameter of approximately 110,000 light years. The object was discovered on October 8, 1785 by the German-British astronomer William Herschel.

See also 
 List of NGC objects (1–1000)

References

External links 
 

Spiral galaxies
550
Cetus (constellation)
005374